The Order of the Frog or The Order of the Ever Jumping and Smiling Little Green Frog is an academic order awarded by the Natural Sciences Faculty Club at Stockholm University since 1917. The motto is "Numquam Veni ad Astra" (No one reaches the stars) and is awarded at the Lucia Ball at Stockholm University as part of the Nobel Prize celebrations to those who have made exceptional contributions to the Natural Sciences or the Natural Sciences Faculty Club. Nobel Laurates in the natural sciences that attend the ball are invested into the Order of the Frog together with other students. Those who are invested are said to have to jump like frogs on the University Campus in keeping with tradition with the original award in 1917.

When a member of the order dies the members closest are asked to return the frog insignia which the members wear around they necks or otherwise destroy it.

References 

Student societies in Sweden
Academic awards